The 2020 ADAC GT Masters was the fourteenth season of the ADAC GT Masters, the grand tourer-style sports car racing founded by the German automobile club ADAC.

Entry list

Calendar and results

Championship standings
Scoring system
Championship points are awarded for the first fifteen positions in each race. Entries are required to complete 75% of the winning car's race distance in order to be classified and earn points. Individual drivers are required to participate for a minimum of 25 minutes in order to earn championship points in any race.

Drivers' championships

Overall

Junior Cup

Trophy Cup

Teams' championship

References

External links

ADAC GT Masters seasons
ADAC GT Masters